Fatatu (also Romanized as Fatātū; also known as Fatāḩ Tūr and Fatānū) is a village in Chapar Khaneh Rural District, Khomam District, Rasht County, Gilan Province, Iran. At the 2006 census, its population was 913, in 234 families.

References 

Populated places in Rasht County